Presidential elections were held in Colombia on 9 February 1930. The result was a victory for Enrique Olaya Herrera of the Liberal Party, who received 44.9% of the vote. He took office on 7 August.

It was the first time since direct presidential elections were introduced in 1914 that a Conservative Party candidate had not won.

Results

References

Presidential elections in Colombia
1930 in Colombia
Colombia